Pura Ulun Danu Batur (also known as "Pura Batur" or "Pura Ulun Danu") is a Hindu Balinese temple located in the island of Bali, Indonesia. As one of the Pura Kahyangan Jagat, Pura Ulun Danu Batur is one of the most important temples in Bali which acted as the maintainer of harmony and stability of the entire island. Pura Ulun Danu Batur represents the direction of North and is dedicated to the god Vishnu and the local goddess Dewi Danu, goddess of Lake Batur, the largest lake in Bali. Following the destruction of the original temple compound, the temple was relocated and rebuilt in 1926. The temple, along with 3 other sites in Bali, form the Cultural Landscape of Bali Province which was inscribed as World Heritage Site by UNESCO in 2012.

Batur village
Batur village is located in close proximity to the caldera of Mount Batur. The village is divided into three perbekelan (administrative division), namely Batur Utara (north), Batur Tengah (middle), and Batur Selatan (south). The villagers make their living as farmers, craftsmen, tradesmen, government workers and in the tourism industry.

History

Pura Batur or Pura Ulun Danu was first established in the 17th-century. The temple was dedicated to the god Vishnu and to the goddess of the lake Dewi Danu. The Lake Batur, the largest lake in Bali, is considered to be of utmost importance in the island of Bali as the primary water source for the agricultural activities in Bali. The word Pura means "temple", while the two words ulun ("head" or "source") and danu ("lake", referring to Lake Batur) is translated as "lake source"; and so the temple name literally means "Lake Source Temple". The word batur, after the village of Batur where the temple is located, means "pure" or "spiritually clean". The definition of Pura Ulun Danu illustrates the significance of the water for the prosperity of the villagers of Batur and for the entire Bali's Hindu community, especially in watering the island's rice paddy fields.

Pura Ulun Danu Batur was mentioned several times in several ancient lontars as one of the sad kahyangan, the six group of universal Pura.

Before the eruption of Mount Batur in 1917, Pura Batur and the original village (then known as Karang Anyar, meaning "New Area") were located at the southwest base of Mount Batur itself. The lava flow of the 1917 eruption caused thousands of casualties. Despite the destruction, the black lava flow stopped at the gates of Pura Ulun Danu Batur. Because the lava stopped before reaching the temple, the Balinese people saw this as a good omen and decided to stay in the area.

On April 21, 1926, Mount Batur erupted again, this time devastating the entire village of Karang Anyar. The lava also advanced toward the temple, covering almost the entire compound. Despite the destruction of the village as well as the loss of 1,500 villagers, the 11-tiered main shrine of the temple survived. With the area surrounding Mount Batur declared uninhabitable during the eruption period, the villagers of Kalang Anyar had to relocate. The relocation process was helped by villagers from the surrounding area e.g. Desa Bayung, Tunggiran, Kedisan, Buanan, Sekardadi. The Dutch Indies government sent in the Bangli regional army and some prisoners to help with the relocation. The surviving 11-tiered shrine was transported to a new location, as well as other important heirlooms of the temple. Among the sacred heirloom of the temple was the gamelan of Pura Batur, which was transported into a special bale at a Pura in Desa Bayung; and a guardian spirit figure (Bhatara Gede) which was transported to another village so that the residents could still worship it during the time of the resettlement.

After a few days, a village rebuilding program was initiated by the Bangli regional government. Funds were collected to construct new houses, administrative offices, and basic infrastructure. After several months, the area surrounding Mount Batur was declared safe, and the village rebuilding program can start immediately. A new location for the village was chosen, this time uphill on the outer rim of Lake Batur's caldera. Land parcels were distributed according to the number of the original families. The entire process was watched by local police officials (mantri polisi) to maintain order. With the completion of the houses and basic infrastructure, the Bangli regional government collected another fund to build a new temple, the present Pura Ulun Danu Batur. With the completion of the temple in 1926, the temple's gamelan and the guardian spirit figure were returned to its own temple. A ceremony was enacted to carry the reunification of the gamelan and the guardian figure into its temple, as well as a cleansing ceremony for the heirloom objects and the new temple.

Temple compound

Pura Batur comprises nine different temples, containing in total 285 shrines and pavilions dedicated to the gods and goddesses of water, agriculture, holy springs, art, crafts, and more. Pura Penataran Agung Batur, the principal temple, has five main courtyards. Its most dominant shrines are the 11-tiered meru situated in the inner and most sacred courtyard, three 9-tiered merus dedicated to Mount Batur, Mount Abang, and Ida Batara Dalem Waturenggong, the deified king of the Gelgel dynasty who ruled from 1460 to 1550. The eight other temples are Penataran Pura Jati, Pura Tirta Bungkah, Pura Taman Sari, Pura Tirta Mas Mampeh, Pura Sampian Wangi, Pura Gunarali, Pura Padang Sila, and Pura Tuluk Biyu.

The main temple Pura Penataran Agung Batur, is divided into three areas: the outer sanctum of the temple (jaba pisan or nistaning mandala), the middle sanctum (jaba tengah or madya mandala), and the inner main sanctum (jero or utamaning mandala).

The main shrine of Pura Ulun Danu Batur is located in the inner sanctum (jero). The main shrine is an 11-tiered meru shrine dedicated to Shiva and his consort Parvati.

Festival
The odalan (main feast) of Pura Ulun Danu Batur takes place on the 10th full moon in a year (Purnama of Sasih Kedasa) according to the Balinese calendar, which usually falls in late March to early April.

See also 
Balinese temple

References

Cited works

 
</ref>

External links

A Thousand Years in Bali (documentary)
Direct Water Democracy in Bali
Pura Batur on Global Heritage Network

Balinese temples
Hindu temples in Indonesia
17th-century Hindu temples